Darrel Shelford is a former professional rugby union and rugby league footballer, and coach.

Early years
Shelford attended Western Heights High School in Rotorua, New Zealand. He is the brother of All Blacks legend Buck Shelford.

Playing career
Shelford played rugby union for the Bay of Plenty Rugby Union, and the New Zealand Māori team before switching codes and heading to England in 1990.

He played rugby league for Bradford Northern, and the Huddersfield Giants, playing in the s.

Shelford played right- in Bradford Northern's 2–12 defeat by Warrington in the 1990–91 Regal Trophy Final during the 1990–91 season at Headingley, Leeds on Saturday 12 January 1991.

Shelford then returned to union, playing for Wakefield RFC.

Representative career
Shelford won five caps for the Scotland national rugby league team while at the Huddersfield Giants in 1995 and 1996, including playing at the 1995 Emerging Nations Tournament.

Coaching career
Shelford has coached the Scottish rugby league side and also worked as an assistant coach at Wakefield RFC, and worked on the coaching staff at Saracens, where his brother Buck was the head coach, and at Arix Viadana in Italy.

He has been employed at the New Zealand Sports Academy as Director.

References

External links
Grovers On A Hat-Trick

1962 births
Living people
Bay of Plenty rugby union players
Bradford Bulls players
Huddersfield Giants players
Māori All Blacks players
New Zealand Māori rugby league players
New Zealand rugby league players
New Zealand rugby union players
People educated at Western Heights High School
Rugby league centres
Rugby league players from Auckland
Rugby union centres
Rugby union players from Auckland
Scotland national rugby league team players
Wakefield RFC players
Workington Town players